Kalashnik may refer to:

 Kalashnik (surname)
 Kalashnyky (disambiguation), several places